Front and Centre was a Canadian music variety television series which aired on CBC Television in 1963.

Premise
Front and Centre was patterned after The Ed Sullivan Show and was recorded with a live audience with a stage shaped like a star. Musical directors such as Lucio Agostini, Ricky Hyslop, and Eddie Karam were featured on various episodes. Dancers appearing during the series run included Don Gillies and Bob Van Norman. Guest artists included Tommy Hunter, Ian and Sylvia and Larry D. Mann.

Series sponsors were Kraft Foods and Pepsi-Cola's Canadian division.

Scheduling
The half-hour series was broadcast Wednesdays at 8:30 p.m. from 3 July to 18 September 1963.

References

External links
 

CBC Television original programming
1963 Canadian television series debuts
1963 Canadian television series endings